Jenő Uhlyárik (15 October 1893 – 23 April 1974) was a Hungarian fencer. He won a silver medal at the 1924 Summer Olympics in the team sabre competition.

References

External links
 

1893 births
1974 deaths
Hungarian male sabre fencers
Olympic fencers of Hungary
Fencers at the 1924 Summer Olympics
Olympic silver medalists for Hungary
Olympic medalists in fencing
People from Levoča
Sportspeople from the Prešov Region
Medalists at the 1924 Summer Olympics